GRS may refer to:

Education 
 Geneva Reformed Seminary, in Greenville, South Carolina
 Gifted Rating Scales, an educational assessment test
 Great River Charter Montessori School, in St. Paul, Minnesota

Science 
 Gamma-ray spectrometer
 Gamma Ray Spectrometer (2001 Mars Odyssey), an instrument on 2001 Mars Odyssey
 Genetic risk score
 Great Red Spot, a feature on Jupiter

Other uses 

 General Railway Signal, a former American railway signaling company
 Gender-affirming surgery, also known as gender reassignment surgery
 The Gerry Ryan Show, an Irish radio show
 Global Resource Serialization, part of the IBM z/OS operating system
 Government Rubber-Styrene (GR-S) produced by the United States Synthetic Rubber Program during World War II
 Grand Rapids Symphony, in Michigan
 Grassroot Soccer, an international health organization
 Graves Registration Service, now Mortuary Affairs, a service of the United States Army
 Gresi language
 Grosseto Air Base, in Italy
 Guilford Rail System, now known as Pan Am Railways, an American railway holding company
 GRS Riflestocks, a Norwegian firearm stock manufacturer
 GRS, acronym for Gauche républicaine et socialiste, a French political party
 Gabungan Rakyat Sabah, a Sabah, Malaysia political party.
 Global Racing Service, a Spanish racing team